Danila Alekseyevich Kalikhanov (born 16 February 2001) is a Russian football player.

Club career
He made his debut in the Russian Football National League for FC Mordovia Saransk on 12 October 2019 in a game against FC Khimki.

References

External links
 
 
 Profile by Russian Football National League

2001 births
Living people
Russian footballers
Association football defenders
FC Mordovia Saransk players
FC Irtysh Omsk players
Russian First League players
Russian Second League players